Oakridge Mall may refer to:
Oakridge Centre, a shopping center in Vancouver, British Columbia
Westfield Oakridge, a shopping center in San Jose, California